The Presbyterian Church in Korea (DongShin) was founded in 1972 as a result of a split in the Presbyterian Church in Korea (DokNoHoe). Two groups in the DokNoHpe opposed each other under the leadership of Kim Chang-Gil and Chung Dae-Shin. The DaeShin grew, but suffered further divisions. Bang-Bo Shin and GaeHyukJeongTong, and Presbyterian Church in Korea (BoSu) also separated. DongShin become a small denomination largely in and around Seoul. The Apostles Creed and Westminster Confession are the generally accepted standards. In 2004 there was 5,264 members and 56 congregations.

References 

Presbyterian denominations in South Korea
Presbyterian denominations in Asia